Kumar Valavhadas Pallana (23 December 1918 – 10 October 2013) was an Indian American character actor and vaudevillian. He performed on the Mickey Mouse Club as a plate spinner and juggler.

Career
Pallana moved to the United States in 1946 and spent 20 years performing around the country before settling down in Texas at his wife's insistence, and started a yoga studio.

Pallana was married to Ranjana Jethwa and had two children, son Dipak and daughter Sandhya. His son Dipak created, owned and operated a cafe called the Cosmic Cup (now Cosmic Cafe) in Dallas, where Kumar met director Wes Anderson and actor Owen Wilson. Anderson subsequently cast Pallana in his films Bottle Rocket, Rushmore, The Royal Tenenbaums and The Darjeeling Limited. Pallana also appeared in the Bollywood movie Anjaana Anjaani  (2010) and the acclaimed independent film Another Earth (2011). A short documentary, KUMAR:MKE, about Pallana's connection to the Milwaukee film scene, was released in 2015.

Death
Pallana died on 10 October 2013 at his home in California at age 94.

Personal life
Pallana's daughter Sandhya Pallana worked with him on The Terminal and other productions. His son Dipak, also an actor, appeared in films such as Bottle Rocket, Rushmore and The Royal Tenenbaums.

Filmography

References

External links

Kumar Pallana interview

1918 births
2013 deaths
Male actors from Indore
Indian male film actors
Vaudeville performers
20th-century Indian male actors
21st-century Indian male actors
Indian male comedians
Indian male stage actors
Male actors in Hindi cinema
Indian emigrants to the United States